The chairperson of the Parliament of Georgia is the presiding officer (speaker) of the Parliament of Georgia. The incumbent speaker is Shalva Papuashvili, since December 29, 2021.

Predecessors of the Parliament of Georgia were the National Council (May 1918 – October 1918), the Parliamentary Assembly (provisional) (1918–1919), the Constituent Assembly (1919–1921), the Parliament (1921), the Supreme Soviet of the Georgian Soviet Socialist Republic (1921–1990) and the Supreme Council of the Republic of Georgia (1990–1992).

The maximum remuneration of the chairperson is 13,000 lari per month.

The chairperson of the Parliament becomes the acting president of Georgia if the president vacates the office before the expiration of their term due to death, resignation or removal from office. Nino Burjanadze is the only speaker to have served as acting president, she did so on two occasions: after the resignation of President Eduard Shevardnadze in 2003 and after President Mikhail Saakashvili briefly left office and called an early election due to political unrest.

List of chairpersons

Chairman of the National Council
Nikolay Chkheidze May 26, 1918 – October 8, 1918

Chairman of the Parliamentary Assembly
Nikolay Chkheidze October 8, 1918 – March 12, 1919

Chairman of the Constituent Assembly
Nikolay Chkheidze March 12, 1919 – February 25, 1921

Chairman of the Parliament
Nikolay Chkheidze February 25, 1921 – Mars 16, 1921

Chairmen of the Supreme Council

Speakers of the Parliament of Georgia

Chairman of the Georgian Parliament

References

See also
President of Georgia
Prime Minister of Georgia
Supreme Council of Georgia

Georgia
Politics of Georgia (country)
1992 establishments in Georgia (country)